Piet Romeijn (born 10 September 1939) is a Dutch former footballer who played for Feyenoord and was part of their European Cup victory in 1970. He earned 4 caps for the Netherlands national football team.

On 30 July 1971 he opened a sport shop in Schiedam.

References 

1939 births
Living people
Dutch footballers
Netherlands international footballers
Feyenoord players
Eredivisie players
Footballers from Schiedam
SV SVV players
Association football defenders
UEFA Champions League winning players